Benzathine benzylpenicillin/procaine benzylpenicillin, sold under the brand name Bicillin C-R, is an antibiotic medication. It contains the antibiotics benzathine benzylpenicillin (penicillin G benzathine) and procaine benzylpenicillin (penicillin G procaine).

References

External links 
 

Combination antibiotics
Combination drugs
Penicillins
Pfizer brands